The 2002–03 Danish 1st Division season was the 58th season of the Danish 1st Division league championship and the 17th consecutive as a second tier competition governed by the Danish Football Association.

The division-champion and runner-up promoted to the 2003–04 Danish Superliga. The teams in the 14th, 15th and 16th relegated to the 2003–04 Danish 2nd Division.

Table

See also
 2002–03 in Danish football
 2002–03 Danish Superliga

External links
 Peders Fodboldstatistik

Danish 1st Division seasons
Denmark
2002–03 in Danish football